The Scottish Christian Alliance is a Christian charitable organisation, based in Scotland and with projects in Glenrothes, Fife & Bridgeton, Glasgow. The charity focusses on working with homeless persons and aiding them back into community / sustainable living.

History 
The Scottish Christian Alliance in its present form goes back to the formation long ago of various independent branches of the 'YWCA of Scotland', some of whom decided in 1987 to merge at that point with an English Charity by the name of 'Christian Alliance' or 'C.A.' and formerly named 'Christian Alliance of Women and Girls' founded back in 1920.

The branches which did merge were Greenock, Edinburgh (which included Kinnaird Christian Hostel in Coates Crescent and the Craigentinny Christian Centre) and finally Muslin Street, Glasgow, which was operating a hostel known as 'Bethany House', the name taken from the old Bethany Hall

There had been a new work started in Glenrothes, Fife under the name of Gilven House in 1985 and this was also involved in the merger, but was not previously a YWCA of Scotland branch.

In 1993, the Christian Alliance, wishing to focus on new housing legislation developments, decided initially to constitute a separate body, an unregistered Housing Association, which was originally named 'Christian Alliance (Scotland) Limited' with charitable status. A Committee of Management was elected and later that year a Director of the Charity was appointed. The brief was to run and manage the work in Scotland.

Not long after this in 1994 the parent charity changed its name to KeyChange and the Christian Alliance followed suit by becoming KeyChange Scotland Limited.

The next alteration did not take place until 1998, when they devolved and became 'Scottish Christian Alliance Limited' giving what they believed was a Scottish 'flavour' and dimension and also reminding them their roots and ethos.

Current 
The charity currently runs two projects; the Glasgow-based works consists of  The ARCH Resettlement Centre and The ARCH Scatter Flats - (Tenancies in the community). 
The Glenrothes-based works consists of the Gilven Project.

References

External links
Scottish Christian Alliance

Christian charities based in Scotland
Charities based in Glasgow
Homelessness in Scotland
Housing in Scotland
Christian organisations based in Scotland